Sophie Bise is a French chef in France at Auberge du Père Bise.

Career
Sophie Bise trained with Pique Pierre in Grenoble, Outhier in La Napoule, La Maree in Paris, and Gaertner in Ammerschwihr. She worked around the world in many kitchens in New York, Venezuela and Brazil, among others, and then returned to Auberge du Père Bise in 1987 to the restaurant started by her parents, grandparents and great grandparents.

In 1985, Sophie enabled the restaurant to earn back one of the Michelin stars lost while her father, Francois Bise, was dying. As a result of her work, Auberge was reinstated as one of 19 top establishments in France.

Publications
Her book,The Auberge du Père Bise, was published in 2013 by Carre Blanc Editions. It contains 38 of her recipes.

References

Living people
French chefs
Women chefs
Head chefs of Michelin starred restaurants
Year of birth missing (living people)
French cookbook writers
Women cookbook writers
21st-century French women writers